The common miner (Geositta cunicularia) is a passerine bird of South America, belonging to the ovenbird family. It is a ground-dwelling bird which feeds on insects and seeds. It has about 9 different subspecies, some of which may be better treated as separate species.

It is 14 to 16 cm long with a fairly long, slightly downcurved bill. The plumage varies geographically but is basically brown above and pale below with a streaked breast, pale stripe over the eye, dark edge to the ear-coverts and pale rufous bar across the wing. The tail is dark with a buff base and variable amounts of buff on the outer feathers. The trilling song is often given in flight and also varies geographically.

The species occurs in open habitats such as grassland, sand dunes and beaches from sea level to high in the Andes. It is widespread and sometimes common across much of Chile, Argentina and Uruguay, parts of Peru and Bolivia and in southernmost Brazil. In winter there is some northward migration by southern birds with a few reaching Paraguay.

The bird lays two or three white eggs in a chamber at the end of a tunnel, up to 3 metres long, dug into an earth bank or sand dune.

References

Harris, Graham (1998) A Guide to the Birds and Mammals of Coastal Patagonia, Princeton University Press. Retrieved 08/06/07.
Grosset, Arthur (2007) Common Miner: Geositta cunicularia. Retrieved 08/06/07.
Jaramillo, Alvaro; Burke, Peter & Beadle, David (2003) Field Guide to the Birds of Chile, Christopher Helm, London

common miner
Birds of the Puna grassland
Birds of Argentina
Birds of Chile
Birds of Uruguay
common miner
Taxa named by Louis Jean Pierre Vieillot